West Germany competed at the 1980 Summer Paralympics in Arnhem, Netherlands. 129 competitors from West Germany won 162 medals including 68 gold, 48 silver and 46 bronze and finished 3rd in the medal table.

See also 
 West Germany at the Paralympics

References 

West Germany at the Paralympics
1980 in West German sport
Nations at the 1980 Summer Paralympics